A Deadhead or Dead Head is a fan of the American jam band the Grateful Dead.

Deadhead or Dead Head may also refer to:

Music
 Dead Head, a Dutch thrash metal band
 "Deadhead", a song by the Stereophonics
 "Deadhead", a song by The Devin Townsend Band on the album Accelerated Evolution
 Deadhead, an American rock band side project featuring Jeremy Bolm

Film and television
 Dead Head (TV series), a British TV drama
 Deadhead, the main character in the Beach Party films
 Deadheads (film), a 2011 film

Other uses
 Dead mileage or deadheading, the movement of commercial vehicles or crews in non-revenue mode
 Deadhead or snag, a partially-submerged tree or branch that poses a hazard to boat navigation

 Deadheading (employee), the practice of an employee traveling fare-free on a public transport carrier
 Deadheading (flowers), pruning dead flowerheads
 Deadhead (Wild Cards), a fictional character from the Wild Cards book series
 Deadheads, a novel by Reginald Hill

See also
 Death's Head, a comic book character
 Deadheading (disambiguation)